KFBU-LD (UHF analog channel 40) was a low-power television station licensed to Bozeman, Montana. It was a repeater that broadcast programming from the Trinity Broadcasting Network, via satellite. The station was owned by Western Family Television.

External links

Television stations in Montana
Trinity Broadcasting Network affiliates
Television channels and stations established in 2007
2007 establishments in Montana
Defunct television stations in the United States
Television channels and stations disestablished in 2021
2021 disestablishments in Montana
FBU-LD